170 (Infrastructure Support) Engineer Group is an engineering group of the British Army's Corps of Royal Engineers.

Today the group controls all of the STREs of the army in addition to 20 Works Group (Air Support), the Royal Monmouthshire Royal Engineers, and 43 HQ and Support Squadron.

History

Military Works Force 
In 1978, following the 1975 Mason Review, the Military Works Force was formed at Chetwynd Barracks to control the Corps of Royal Engineers's works groups. It controlled the specialist engineering units and helped in commanding and providing those special services. The group was originally formed with the control of just two Commanders Royal Engineers (CREs) each with three Specialist Teams Royal Engineers (STREs), but this force was later expanded. At one time, the command controlled 530 STRE (Maintenance), but it is unknown when this STRE was formed, disbanded, and assigned to the group. The four CREs of the command included;

 Headquarters, Chetwynd Barracks
 62 Chief Engineer (Works) [Water utilities, water development, and well drilling]
 63 Chief Engineer (Works) [Electrical power generation and distribution, originally utilities and force protection]
 64 Chief Engineer (Works) [Fuels, fuel production, and distribution]
 65 Chief Engineer(Works) (V) [Civilian infrastructure, railway and ports infrastructure lines of communications]

170 Engineer Group 
In 2003, the 2003 Delivering Security in a Changing World reforms were announced. By 2005, engineer groups were regulated and renamed, one the changes being the Military Work Force being renamed as 170 (Infrastructure Support) Engineer Group and placed under the 8th Force Engineer Brigade. In addition to the changed of the group, the CRE units were re-titled as Works Groups.  The name was also brought to represent the group as a military organisation rather than a civil organisation.  Between 2005 and present, the group saw many units come and go, those who were included, but no longer;

 67 Works Group (2011—2015) [Disbanded under Army 2020]
Royal Monmouthshire Militia RE (2013—????) [Removed before 2015]
 Provisional Reconstruction Team (Operation Herrick)

During the sub-groups' time within the engineer group, many saw themselves take on a territorial, later reserve, specialist team.  Following the initial Army 2020 reforms, each works group control a reserve specialist team regularly, as opposed to randomly for deployments.  Following these initial reforms, the group was due to take control of the Royal Monmouthshire Militia, but this was reverted in 2015 when the refine announced they were to move under control of Headquarters Royal Engineers, 3rd (United Kingdom) Division.

In 2015, the Army 2020 Refine was published, as an "updated chapter" to the initial Army 2020 reform.  Under this refine, the group HQ is to move to Gamecock Barracks.  The group HQ is also due to have a decrease of 9 personnel.  Following the reform, the group now has the following structure;

 Group Headquarters, Chetwynd Barracks (Moving to Gamecock Barracks by 2021)
 43 Headquarters and Support Squadron, Chetwynd Barracks (Moving to Gamecock Barracks by 2021)
20 Works Group (Air Support), RAF Wittering
 Group HQ and 529 Airfield STRE
 531 STRE, RAF Waddington
 532 STRE, RAF Coningsby
 533 STRE, RAF Wattisham
 534 STRE, RAF Marham
 62 Works Group, Chetwynd Barracks (Providing water support) (Moving to Gamecock Barracks by 2021)
 519 STRE (Works)
 523 STRE (Works)
 521 STRE (Water Development)
 506 STRE (Water Infrastructure) (V)
 63 Works Group, Chetwynd Barracks (Providing power support) (Moving to Gamecock Barracks by 2021)
 518 STRE (Works)
 523 STRE (Works)
 528 STRE (Power)
 504 STRE (Power Infrastructure) (V)
 64 Works Group, Chetwynd Barracks (Fuel support) (Moving to Gamecock Barracks by 2021)
 516 STRE (Bulk Petroleum)
 524 STRE (Works)
 527 STRE (Works)
 503 STRE (Fuels Infrastructure) (V)
 65 Works Group (V), Chetwynd Barracks (Infrastructure support) (Moving to Gamecock Barracks by 2021)
 507 STRE (Railway Infrastructure) (V)
 508 STRE (Works) (V)
 509 STRE (Works Infrastructure) (V)
 525 STRE (Works) (V)
 526 STRE (Works) (V)
 66 Works Group, Chetwynd Barracks (Air support) (Moving to Gamecock Barracks by 2021)
 517 STRE (Works)
 522 STRE (Works)
 530 STRE (Materials)
 510 STRE (Air Infrastructure) (V)

Commander 
Current and former Commanders of the Engineer Group include:

 2005–2008: Col. J. David McIlroy
 2008-2011: Col. W.H. Smith
 2011-2013: Col. Steven P.W. Boyd
 2013–2015: Col. David J. Brambell
 2015–2017: Col. James Crawford
 2017–2020: Col. Peter T. Quaite
 2020–Present: Col. Gavin P. Hatcher

Notes

References

Sources 
 Watson, Graham E, and Richard A Rinaldi. The Corps of Royal Engineers: Organisation and Units 1889-2018. Tiger Lilly Books, 2018. 

Groups of the Royal Engineers
Military units and formations established in 1978
Group sized units of the British Army